Reedy Creek is a locality in central Victoria, Australia. It is at 358 metres (1175 feet) elevation. It is approximately 15 minutes from Broadford, Vic, 3658. 

The town was established in 1861 for gold mining purposes, with housing, a school, pubs, and other buildings being built. The school was closed in 1967 and turned into the town hall, the post office was closed in 1965, and by 1903 only two pubs were open, both of which are now closed.
The town was named for  the creek that runs around it and under the bridge at the town's entrance. The creek is only filled by large rainfalls, and for most of the year it is dry. The town is also surrounded by bushland, and is in a valley.

References

External links

Victorian Places - Reedy Creek

Towns in Victoria (Australia)
Shire of Mitchell